41 Andromedae is a single star in the northern constellation of Andromeda. 41 Andromedae is the Flamsteed designation. It is bright enough to be faintly visible to the naked eye, having an apparent visual magnitude of 5.04.

The stellar classification for this star is A2IIIvs, matching an A-type giant star with narrow (sharp) absorption lines. Abt and Levy (1985) classed it as a kA2hA6mA6 star, which indicates the spectrum has the calcium K line of an A2 star, the hydrogen lines of an A6 star, and the metal lines of an A6 star. It is around 450 million years old and is spinning with a projected rotational velocity of 84 km/s. The star has 2.27 times the mass of the Sun and is radiating 29 times the Sun's luminosity from its photosphere at an effective temperature of 8,511 K.

References

A-type giants
Am stars
High-proper-motion stars
Andromeda (constellation)
Durchmusterung objects
Andromedae, 41
006658
005317
0324